Lucy Blake is an American conservationist, President of the Northern Sierra Partnership. She was a 2000 MacArthur Fellow.

She founded the Sierra Business Council and won the Pat Brown Award.
Blake works for the Department of Energy on energy and natural resources.

References

American conservationists
Living people
MacArthur Fellows
Year of birth missing (living people)